Mukuro (骸) is a Japanese name that means corpse.

Mukuro may refer to:
, a character in YuYu Hakusho
, the re-animated zombie of Shikyoh in The Last Blade
 Mukuro, a character in Samurai Champloo 
 Mukuro Gyoubu, a monster in Battle Raper 2
 Mukuro or Kenji, a character in Red Earth and Capcom Fighting Evolution
, a character in Reborn!
, known as "Hunter Pace" in the English dub, a character in Yu-Gi-Oh! 5D's.
, a character in Danganronpa
 Mukuro, specifically the eponymous mecha piloted by the main character in "Kuromukuro"
 Nobume Imai, a character in Gin Tama whose original name was Mukuro (骸).
, a fictional character in the light novel series Date A Live.

Japanese masculine given names
Japanese unisex given names